Genesee County Airport  is a county-owned, public-use airport in Genesee County, New York, United States. It is located two nautical miles (4 km) north of the central business district of Batavia, a city located within the Town of Batavia.

This airport is included in the National Plan of Integrated Airport Systems for 2011–2015, which categorized it as a general aviation reliever airport. Although many U.S. airports use the same three-letter location identifier for the FAA and IATA, this airport is assigned GVQ by the FAA but has no designation from the IATA.

Facilities and aircraft 
It has one runway designated 10/28 with an asphalt surface measuring 5,500 by 100 feet (1,676 x 30 m).

For the 12-month period ending September 18, 2009, the airport had 40,000 aircraft operations, an average of 109 per day: 96% general aviation, 2% air taxi, and 2% military. At that time there were 48 aircraft based at this airport: 85% single-engine, 4% multi-engine, 6% jet and 4% helicopter.

Nearby airports 
Nearby airports with instrument approach procedures include:
 9G6 – Pine Hill Airport (10 nm NW)
 5G0 – Le Roy Airport (11 nm E)
 9G3 – Akron Airport (14 nm W)
 7G0 – Ledgedale Airpark (14 nm NE)
 ROC – Greater Rochester International Airport (22 nm E)

References

External links 
 Airport page at Genesee County website
 Genesee County Airport (GVQ) at NYSDOT Airport Directory 
 Aerial image as of April 1994 from USGS The National Map
 

Airports in New York (state)
Transportation in Genesee County, New York
Buildings and structures in Genesee County, New York